Diclinanona is a genus of plants in the family Annonaceae.

Description
Diclinanona are small trees with flowers. Each flower has 6 petals, which have numerous stamens.

Species
Diclinanona comprises three species distributed in Brazil, Colombia, Peru and Venezuela:  
 Diclinanona calycina (Diels) R.E.Fr.
 Diclinanona matogrossensis Maas
 Diclinanona tessmannii Diels

References

Annonaceae
Annonaceae genera
Flora of Brazil
Flora of Colombia
Flora of Peru
Flora of Venezuela